Magic City is an American drama television series created by Mitch Glazer for the Starz network. The pilot episode previewed on Starz March 30, 2012, and premiered April 6, 2012. Starz renewed the series for an eight-episode second season on March 20, 2012, and canceled it August 5, 2013, after two seasons.

Set in 1959 Miami, Florida, shortly after the Cuban Revolution, Magic City tells the story of Ike Evans (Jeffrey Dean Morgan), the owner of Miami's most glamorous hotel, the Miramar Playa. Evans is forced to make an ill-fated deal with Miami Jewish Mob boss Ben Diamond (Danny Huston) to ensure the success of his glitzy establishment.

Cast and characters

Main
 Jeffrey Dean Morgan as Isaac "Ike" Evans, majority owner and boss of the Miramar Playa, Miami Beach's premier resort hotel
 Olga Kurylenko as Vera Evans, Ike's second wife, stepmother to Stevie, Danny, and Lauren Evans, convert to the Evans' Judaism, and former Havana nightclub dancer under the name "Vera Cruz"
 Steven Strait as Steven "Stevie" Evans, Ike Evans' "bad boy" older son and the manager of the Miramar's Atlantis Lounge
 Jessica Marais as Lily Diamond, Ben Diamond's third (trophy) wife and the secret lover of Stevie Evans
 Christian Cooke as Daniel "Danny" Evans, Ike's straight-arrow younger son and a law school student
 Elena Satine as Judi Silver, a prostitute who works out of the Atlantis Lounge and does occasional jobs for Ike and Stevie
 Dominik Garcia-Lorido as Mercedes Lazaro, a Miramar housekeeper in training to be a Pan Am stewardess and Danny's love interest
 Taylor Blackwell as Lauren Evans, Ike's teenage daughter (main, season 1; recurring, season 2)
 Danny Huston as Benjamin "Ben The Butcher" Diamond, a Jewish-American mobster, a boss in the Miami Jewish Mob, and the silent minority owner of the Miramar
 Kelly Lynch as Megan "Meg" Bannock, the older sister of Ike's late first wife Molly (recurring, season 1; main, season 2)

Recurring

 Yul Vazquez as Victor Lazaro, the hotel's general manager, Mercedes' father, and a first-generation Cuban immigrant
 Alex Rocco as Arthur Evans, Ike's father
 Leland Orser as Michael "Mike" Strauss, a labor union official
 Michael Rispoli as Belvin "Bel" Jaffe, a gangster and bookie in the  Jewish Mob who works for Ben Diamond out of the back room of the Sea Breeze Lingerie shop in the Miramar's shopping arcade
 Bradford Tatum as Albert "Dandy Al" Haas
 Andrew Bowen as David "Divin' Dave" Donahue
 Willa Ford as Janice Michaels
 John Cenatiempo as Vincent Lamb
 Michael Beasley as Grady James
 Karen-Eileen Gordon as Florence
 Taylor Anthony Miller as Raymond "Ray-Ray" Mathis, a doorman at the Miramar
 Karen Garcia as Inez, Arthur Evans' nurse
 Shelby Fenner as Myrnna
 Catalina Rodriguez as Theresa
 Ricky Waugh as Barry "Cuda" Lansman
 Matt Ross as Jack Klein, State Attorney for Dade County
 Todd Allen Durkin as Douglas "Doug" Feehan
 Chad Gall as Ethan Bell
 Garrett Kruithof as Stout
 Gregg Weiner as Phillip "Phil" Weiss
 Jordan Woods-Robinson as Sterling Voss
 Avi Hoffman as Sidney "Sid" Raskin
 Sherilyn Fenn as Madame Renee
 Esai Morales as Carlos 'El Tiburon' Ruiz
 James Caan as Sybert "Sy" Berman, a Chicago-based mob boss

Episodes

Season 1 (2012)

Season 2 (2013)

Production

Conception

Magic City was created by Miami native Mitch Glazer, who wrote the series around his experiences growing up there: he once worked as a cabana boy in a Miami Beach hotel, his father was an electrical engineer at the city's grand hotels in the late 1950s, and he grew up listening to stories of the exploits of hotel staff and clientele. Many of the incidents Glazer relates in the series "are based on stories that happened, that I saw, or older brothers and sisters or my parents told me." As a journalist, he did extensive research on what was happening in the lobbies of hotels in late 1950s and early 1960s: "There’s wiretaps—tapes they’ve made public now—where the CIA gives Sam Giancana and Johnny Roselli $300,000 and poison powder to kill [Fidel] Castro in the Boom Boom Room in the Fontainebleau Hotel," he said. Included in the series, Glazer states, will be Central Intelligence Agency (CIA) activities in Cuba and issues connected to the Civil Rights Movement. He first envisioned Magic City as a feature film, but said he quickly realized he had more stories to tell than would fit in a film.

Glazer had written different versions of Magic City for years. He originally wrote and sold it to CBS, who eventually let it go to the Starz network. "CBS was really nice to me and generous in letting it go to Starz. It’s not a procedural, it’s not a franchise. It needs to be allowed to do the sexuality and violence and the things that were part of Miami Beach in the 1959", he said. In 2007, Chris Albrecht (subsequently Starz network's president and C.E.O.) was fired from HBO and joined Glazer and some of his friends for a research expedition to Havana. "It was an insane group," Glazer remembered. "Jimmy Caan and Robert Duvall and Benicio Del Toro." They were visiting a Havana hotel designed by the architect Morris Lapidus when Glazer remarked to Albrecht, "You know, I grew up in this kind of hotel. My father worked with Morris Lapidus on the Fontainebleau Hotel and Eden Roc Hotel as an electrical engineer." In 2009, after Albrecht became president and C.E.O. of Starz, Glazer recalled, "I sent him a script I had written years before, and he called me literally hours later and said, 'This is amazing, let's do this.'"

Reception

Critical reception
The first season received mixed reviews from critics. Review aggregator Metacritic calculated a score of 56/100 based on 27 reviews. Glenn Garvin of the Miami Herald said of the series: "The sordid ugliness that festers inside Magic City's voluptuously beautiful wrappings makes irresistible television." The Contra Costa Times’ Chuck Barney praised the cast and visual style. He said in his review: "Through the early episodes, nothing really happens that you couldn't see coming. Still, the setting is so seductive, the period details so vivid and the acting so stellar, that it's as intoxicating as a potent mojito." NJ.com criticized the gratuitous nudity ("Hey, boobs!") in many dressing room scenes.

Awards and accolades

Movie spin-off
A feature film is in the works and is set to be directed by Mitch Glazer. Stars Jeffrey Dean Morgan, Olga Kurylenko, Danny Huston, and Kelly Lynch are set to reprise their roles. Bruce Willis and Bill Murray will also have starring roles.
As of September 2021, there have been no further updates from either Starz or Glazer on the film, leaving its production as increasingly unlikely.

Home media
The entire Magic City series was released by Starz and Anchor Bay in Blu-ray and DVD formats on May 13, 2014.

See also

 List of films and television shows set in Miami

References

External links
 
 

 
2010s American drama television series
2012 American television series debuts
2013 American television series endings
English-language television shows
Starz original programming
Television series about organized crime
Television series set in the 1960s
Television shows set in Miami
Works about Jewish-American organized crime